Ibatia is a genus of flowering plants belonging to the family Apocynaceae.

Its native range is Panama to Tropical America.

Species:

Ibatia aristeguietae 
Ibatia boliviensis 
Ibatia ciliata 
Ibatia cordata 
Ibatia cumanensis 
Ibatia demuneri 
Ibatia dugandii 
Ibatia elliptica 
Ibatia fiebrigii 
Ibatia fontana 
Ibatia friesii 
Ibatia ganglinosa 
Ibatia harleyi 
Ibatia laciniata 
Ibatia lanosa 
Ibatia maritima 
Ibatia mollis 
Ibatia morilloana 
Ibatia nigra 
Ibatia pacifica 
Ibatia rubra 
Ibatia rusbyi 
Ibatia santosii 
Ibatia schreiteri 
Ibatia venturii 
Ibatia woodii

References

Apocynaceae
Apocynaceae genera
Taxa named by Joseph Decaisne